The first election to Llanelli Borough Council was held in April 1973. It was followed by the 1976 election. On the same day there were elections to the other local authorities and community councils in Wales.

Results

Llanelli Borough Ward One (three seats)

Llanelli Borough Ward Two (three seats)

Llanelli Borough Ward Three (three seats)

Llanelli Borough Ward Four (three seats)

Llanelli Borough Ward Five (three seats)
This ward included Kidwelly and Trimsaran

Llanelli Borough Ward Six (three seats)
This ward covered Burry Port.

Llanelli Borough Ward Seven (three seats)
This ward covered Llanedi and Llangennech

Llanelli Borough Ward Eight (three seats)

Llanelli Borough Ward Nine (three seats)

Llanelli Borough Ward Ten (three seats)

Llanelli Borough Ward Eleven (three seats)

References

1973
1973 Welsh local elections